Several Branches of the Rashtrakuta dynasty were created by the kings, commanders and relatives of the Rashtrakuta family during their expansion into central and northern India in the eighth to the tenth centuries. These kingdoms ruled during the reign of the parent empire or continued to rule for centuries after its fall or came to power much later. Well known among these were the Rashtrakutas of Gujarat (757-888), the Rattas of Saundatti (875-1230) in modern Karnataka, the Rashtrakutas of Rajasthan (known as Rajputana) and ruling from Hastikundi or Hathundi (893-996), Dahal (near Jabalpur), the Rathores of Mandore and Dhanop, Reddy dynasty of Andhra Pradesh and Telangana,
Rashtraudha dynasty of Mayuragiri in modern Maharashtra and Rashtrakutas of Kanauj.

Rashtrakuta branches
These branches emerged as a result of Rashtrakuta conquest of North India.

Rashtrakutas of Lata (Gujarat):
 Indra  (807-818)  (brother of Govinda III above)
 Karka and Govinda  (818-826)
 Dhruva II  (835-845)
 Akalavarsha Shubhatunga (867)
 Dhruva III (-871)
 Direct rule from Manyakhet by Krishna II

Rashtrakutas of Hastikundi (Hathundi) (Jodhpur)
 Harivarma
 Vidagdha  (916-938)
 Mammata  (939)
 Balaprasada (997)
 The Hathundi Rathores (descendants)

Rashtrakutas of Dahal (near Jabalpur) (Madhya Pradesh)
 Golhanadeva (1023)

Rashtrakutas of Kanauj (11th. century-13th. century)
 Gopal (4th king)
 Tribhuvana
 Madanapala (1119)
 Devapala (Lost Shravasti to Gahadavalas in 1128)
 Bhimapala
 Surapala
 Amritapala
 Lakhanpala (In 1202 defeated byQutub-ud-din)
 Mahasamanta Barahadeva (under Gahadavala Adakkhamalla)
Rashtrakutas of Mandore/Jodhpur
 The lineage of Rathors 1226 - To date (Mandore/Jodhpur)

According to one theory, the Gahadavalas were an offshoot of the Rashtrakutas of Kannauj, but this theory is contradicted by epigraphic evidence.

Descendants Of Rashtrakuta

Their descendants are spread out over large areas of India. The Rashtraudha dynasty of Mayuragiri, Maharashtra, described in the Rashtraudha Kavya (1596) of Rudrakavi, the Rathor Rajputs of Jodhpur and the Rattas of Saundatti in Karnataka also claim descent from them. The archaeological evidences are pointing towards the possible links between Rashtrakutas and Reddy of Andhra Pradesh and Telangana.

Notes

References

Rajput era
Dynasties of India